The 1991 Virginia Slims of Philadelphia was a women's tennis tournament played on indoor carpet courts at the Philadelphia Civic Center in Philadelphia, Pennsylvania in the United States that was part of the Tier II category of the 1991 WTA Tour. It was the ninth edition of the tournament and was held from November 11 through November 17, 1991. First-seeded Monica Seles won the singles title and earned $70,000 first-prize money.

Finals

Singles
 Monica Seles defeated  Jennifer Capriati 7–5, 6–1
 It was Seles' 7th singles title of the year and the 39th of her career.

Doubles
 Jana Novotná /  Larisa Neiland defeated  Mary Joe Fernández /  Zina Garrison-Jackson 6–2, 6–4

References

External links
 ITF tournament edition details
 Tournament draws

Virginia Slims of Philadelphia
Advanta Championships of Philadelphia
Virginia Slims of Philadelphia
Virginia Slims of Philadelphia
Virginia Slims of Philadelphia